Shandao Temple (formerly transliterated as Shantao Temple Station until 2003), secondary station name Huashan, is a station on the Bannan line of Taipei Metro in Zhongzheng District, Taipei, Taiwan. It is named after the Shandao Temple.

Station overview

The two-level, underground station structure with an island platform and six exits. It is located at the intersection of Zhongxiao East Road and Linsen Road. It is a relatively quiet station on a busy metro line.

Station layout

Exits	
Exit 1: National Police Agency	
Exit 2: Intersection of Zhongxiao E. Rd. Sec. 1 and Linsen S. Rd., south side of Zhongxiao E. Rd. Sec. 1	
Exit 3: Lane 58, Zhongxiao E. Rd. Sec. 1, south side of Zhongxiao E. Rd. Sec. 1 	
Exit 4: Qingdao Public Housing	
Exit 5: Huashan Market	
Exit 6: Shandao Temple

Around the station
 Insect Science Museum
 Mayor's Residence Art Salon
 Sheraton Grand Taipei Hotel
 Taiwan Film and Audiovisual Institute

References

1999 establishments in Taiwan
Bannan line stations
Railway stations opened in 1999